Beartown is an unincorporated community located in McDowell County, West Virginia, United States. Beartown lies along the Norfolk and Western Railroad on Dry Fork.

References 

Unincorporated communities in McDowell County, West Virginia
Unincorporated communities in West Virginia